Smith River is a tributary of the McKenzie River in Linn County in the U.S. state of Oregon.

Three named tributaries enter Smith River, all from the right. From source to mouth, they are Gate, Browder, and Bunchgrass creeks.

Lakes End campground
About halfway through its course, Smith River enters Smith Reservoir, which covers  when filled to capacity. The primitive campground, Lakes End, has 17 sites for tents. Amenities include toilets and picnic tables but no drinking water. The campground is generally open from May through September.

Power plants
Smith Reservoir functions as a holding tank for water used to generate electricity at two power plants along the McKenzie River. The Carmen–Smith Hydroelectric Project, owned by the Eugene Water and Electric Board, shunts water through a tunnel from the Carmen Diversion Reservoir on the upper McKenzie to Smith Reservoir, which has a bigger holding capacity. From there, water is piped from Smith Reservoir to the Carmen Power Plant. Water from the plant discharges into the Trail Bridge Reservoir then generates more electricity at the Trail Bridge Power Plant before returning to the McKenzie below Trail Bridge Dam.

See also
List of rivers of Oregon

References

External links
McKenzie Watershed Council

Rivers of Linn County, Oregon
Rivers of Oregon